Soňa Moravčíková (born 5 December 1999) is a Slovak alpine skier. She competed in the women's giant slalom at the 2018 Winter Olympics.

References

1999 births
Living people
Slovak female alpine skiers
Olympic alpine skiers of Slovakia
Alpine skiers at the 2018 Winter Olympics
Sportspeople from Bratislava